Proctorville may refer to:

 Proctorville, Ohio
 Proctorville, North Carolina